The bicolored antpitta (Grallaria rufocinerea) is a species of bird in the family Grallariidae. In 2020, genetic evidence revealed that the bicolored pitta is a member of the rufous antpitta species complex. It is found in Colombia and Ecuador.  Its natural habitat is subtropical or tropical moist montane forest. It is threatened by habitat loss.

References

External links
 BirdLife Species Factsheet.

bicolored antpitta
Birds of the Colombian Andes
Birds of the Ecuadorian Andes
bicolored antpitta
bicolored antpitta
bicolored antpitta
Taxonomy articles created by Polbot